Jenni Rivera: Mariposa de Barrio, la serie, or simply Mariposa de Barrio, is an American biographical telenovela based on the autobiography Unbreakable: My Story, My Way authored by Jenni Rivera before her death and was published posthumously in July 2013. It stars Angélica Celaya as the titular character, and it started airing on American broadcast channel Telemundo on June 27, 2017, and concluded on November 6, 2017.

The first season of the series was made available on Netflix on December 15, 2017 with other regions streaming the series from January 1, 2021.

Plot 
The inspiring and poignant story will follow in the footsteps of Jenni Rivera towards a dream of fame; An autobiographical journey from birth, based on her book "Unbreakable", as well as unpublished testimonies that reveal, as never before, her own family and explore her life as a daughter, mother, wife, lover and artist.

Cast

Main characters 

 Angélica Celaya as Jenni Rivera
 Gabriel Porras as Pedro Rivera
 Rosalinda Rodríguez as Rosa Saavedra de Rivera
 Samadhi Zendejas as Jenni Rivera (13-25 Years old)
 Tony Garza as José Trinidad Marín
 Regina Orquín as Jenni Rivera (9-12 Years old)
 Enrique Montaño as Pedro "Pete" Rivera (19-30 Years old) 
 Adrián Carvajal as Pedro "Pete" Rivera (31-48 Years old)
 Adriano Zendejas as Gustavo Rivera (17-28 Years old)
 Emmanuel Morales as Gustavo Rivera (29-46 Years old)
 Xavier Ruvalcaba as Lupillo Rivera (15-22 Years old)
 Raúl Sandoval as Lupillo Rivera (23-40 Years old)
 Mauricio Novoa as Juan Rivera (15-20 Years old)
 Uriel del Toro as Juan Rivera (21-34 Years old)
 Ana Wolfermann as Rosie Rivera (12-17 Years old)
 Stephanie Arcila as Rosie Rivera (18-31 Years old)
 Vanessa Pose as Chiquis Rivera (14-27 Years old)
 Alma Matrecito as Jackie Rivera (13-23 Years old)
 Pepe Gámez as Juan Manuel López
 Christopher Millán as Fernando Ramírez
 Ricardo Kleinbaum as Esteban Loaiza Vega
 Julio César Otero as Trinidad "Mikey" Marín Rivera (14-21 Years old)
 Gabriela Sepúlveda as Jenicka López Rivera (12-15 Years old)
 Gael Sánchez as Juan Ángel “Johnny” López Rivera (8-11 Years old)

Recurring characters 
 Gabriela González as Ramona Suárez (28-45 Years old)
 Paloma Márquez as Patricia Benitez (26-43 Years old)
 Laura Vieira as Brenda Martínez (20-34 Years old)
 Diana Marcoccia as Gladyz
 Yrahid Leylanni as Fabiola Llerandi
 Sonia Noemí as Consuelo Ramírez
 Ronald Reyes as Gabriel Vásquez
 Carlos Guerrero as Pete Salgado
 Alexis Venegas as Adán Terriquez
 Eduardo Antonio as Jaime Terriquez
 Tony Vela as Pepe Garza
 Jeyson Rodríguez as Jacob Yebale
 Oliver Gutiérrez as Jorge Sánchez
 Julio Ocampo as Pedro Rivera (17-34 Years old)
 Adriana Bermúdez as Rosa Rivera (15-32 Years old)
 Braulio Hernández as Pedro Rivera Saavedra (14-17 Years old)
 John Díaz as Gustavo Rivera (12-15 Years old)
 Noah Rico as Lupillo Rivera (6-9 Years old)
 Nicholas Forero as Lupillo Rivera (11-13 Years old)
 Martín Fajardo as Juan Rivera (5-7 Years old)
 Kevin Cabrera as Juan Rivera (9-14 Years old)
 Mauricio Novoa as Juan Rivera (15-20 Years old)
 Orlyana Rondón as Rosie Rivera (4-7 Years old)
 Luz de Sol Padula as Rosie Rivera (8-11 Years old)
 Maya Idarraga as Chiquis Rivera (2-3 Years old)
 Paola Real as Chiquis Rivera (4-7 Years old)
 Dariana Fustes as Chiquis Rivera (8-13 Years old)
 Fabiana Lion as Jacquelin Melina Marín Rivera (4-6 Years old)
 Samantha Lopez as Jacquelin Melina Marín Rivera (9-12 Years old)
 David Hernández as Trinidad Marín Rivera (5-6 Years old)
 Miguel Cubillos as Trinidad Marín Rivera (7-10 Years old)
 Christian Alfonso as Trinidad Marín Rivera (11-13 Years old)
 Isabela Hernández as Jenicka López Rivera (3-4 Years old)
 Giana Deftereos as Jenicka López Rivera (5-7 Years old)
 Daniel García as Jhonny Ángel López Rivera (4-7 Years old)
 Thamara Aguilar as Ramona Suárez (18-27 Years old)

Special guest stars 
 Don Francisco as himself
 Charytín Goyco as herself

Production 
The series is created by the Venezuelan writer Rossana Negrín, based on the autobiography Unbreakable: My Story, My Way written by Jenni Rivera published in July 2013. It is the only authorized version on the life of Rivera, based also on some testimonies published in the books "My Broken Pieces: Mending the Wounds From Sexual Abuse Through Faith, Family and Love" written by her sister, Rosie Rivera and "Forgiveness" written by Chiquis Rivera, her daughter. 90 episodes were ordered for broadcast.

Music

Track listing

Ratings

Episodes

Awards and nominations

References

External links 
 

Telemundo telenovelas
2017 telenovelas
American telenovelas
Spanish-language American telenovelas
Spanish-language television shows
Television series based on singers and musicians
2017 American television series debuts
Jenni Rivera
2017 American television series endings